Club Deportivo Águilas de la Universidad Autónoma de Guerrero is a Mexican football club that plays in the Tercera División de México. The club is based in Chilpancingo, Guerrero and was founded in 2015.

History
The team was founded in 2015. In its first season, it finished as the best team in group 6, however, the club would only reach the round of 32, where it was eliminated by Tigrillos Dorados MRCI, in its first season the team played under the name Vikingos de Chalco. Before the start of the 2016–17 season the team achieved its own official club registration and was able to compete under its real name.

In 2019 the team is relocated to Acapulco due to remodeling works in its original stadium.

Stadium
Unidad Deportiva Acapulco (English:Acapulco Sports Complex) is a sports complex composed of a 13,000-seat soccer and track and field stadium and a baseball stadium which can seat thousands.

Rivalry
Águilas UAGro has an important rivalry with the C.D. Avispones de Chilpancingo, team representative of the City of Chilpancingo, the match is known as the Clásico Guerrerense.

Players

First-team squad

See also
Football in Mexico
Tercera División de México

External links
Tercera División

References 

Association football clubs established in 2015
Football clubs in Guerrero
2015 establishments in Mexico
Chilpancingo